Borojević is a Serbian and Croatian surname. It derives from personal name Boroje (Бороје), derived from the word bor meaning "pine", with the possessive suffix -ev (Boroje's). The suffix ić is a diminutive designation, or descendant designation. Thus the last name can be translated as Boroje's son.

People with last name Borojević:
Svetozar Borojević von Bojna, Austro-Hungarian field marshal described as one of the finest defensive strategists of the First World War
Igor Borojević, Serbian musician
Petar Borojević (1916—1982), National Hero of Yugoslavia
Nikola Borojević (1795-1872), Serbian poet
Slavko Borojević (1919-1999), Yugoslav academician and plant geneticist

See also 
Bogojević
Borojevići, Croatia
Borojevići, Bosnia and Herzegovina
Bor, Serbia

Serbian surnames